The Longhai Expressway is a  long elevated expressway in Zhengzhou, Henan, China. 

The construction of the expressway began in 2013 and was finished in 2015. The maximum speed on the expressway is 80 km/h.

Route
The expressway eastern terminus is at Shangdu Avenue (G220 / G310). It is then elevated above Anping Road, Yongping Road, Huozhan Street, and Longhai Road from east to west.

The Route B5 of Zhengzhou BRT runs mostly under this elevated expressway.

Exit list 

From east to west:

References

Expressways in Henan
Transport in Henan
Expressways in Zhengzhou